The National Research Development Corporation (NRDC) was a non-departmental government body established by the British Government to transfer technology from the public sector to the private sector.

History
The NRDC was established by Attlee's Labour government in 1948 to meet a perceived need at the time to exploit the many products that had been developed during World War II by the Defence Research Establishments. It was set up by the Board of Trade under the Development of Inventions Act 1948  and the first managing director was Lord Giffard.

The NRDC was established in India in 1953 to help develop and promote technologies developed at various national R&D institutions.

The first commercial size hovercraft, the SR.N1, was built under a contract let by the NRDC to Saunders-Roe in 1958.

In 1981, the NRDC was combined with the National Enterprise Board ('NEB') to form the British Technology Group ('BTG').

Operations
Typically the NRDC would patent the product for commercial exploitation and earn royalties as private sector companies generated sales from those products. Examples of such products include carbon fibre, asbestos-plastic composites and developments in semi-conductor technology.

The development of the hovercraft would also not have taken place without the involvement of the NRDC.

In the 1970s, a team of Rothamsted Research scientists discovered three pyrethroids suitable for use as insecticides, namely  permethrin, cypermethrin and deltamethrin. These compounds were subsequently licensed as NRDC 143, 149 and 161 respectively, to companies which then manufactured them for use worldwide.

List of chairmen 
 1950–1955: Percy Mills, 1st Viscount Mills
 1955–1957: Sir Alan Arthur Saunders
 1957–1969: William Black, Baron Black
 1969–1979: Frank Schon, Baron Schon

See also
National Enterprise Board
Minister of Technology
Alvey

References

Further reading
 Lavington, Simon. "NRDC and the Market." Moving Targets, History of Computing  (2011): 147-191.
 John Crawley (1993) NRDC’s role in the early British computer industry. Resurrection, the Bulletin of the Computer Conservation Society, issue number 8, winter 1993, pp 25–32
 Crawley HJ (1957) The National Research Development Corporation Computer Project. NRDC Computer Sub-Committee, paper 132, Feb 1957.

Source documents
 National Archive for the History of Computing, University of Manchester

Economy of the United Kingdom
Defunct public bodies of the United Kingdom
Research and development in the United Kingdom
1948 establishments in the United Kingdom